The Chairman of Committees was an elected position of the New Zealand House of Representatives. The role existed between 1854 and 1992. The roles of the Chairman of Committees were to deputise for the Speaker, and to chair the House when it was in committee. The role is now carried out by the Deputy Speaker. The role of Chairman of Committees also existed for the Legislative Council.

Establishment
The position was established during the first session of the 1st New Zealand Parliament. Parliament first convened on 24 May 1854, and on 21 June of that year, Auckland lawyer Frederick Merriman was elected as its first Chairman of Committees. The role also existed for the Legislative Council, was established in 1865 and first held by Mathew Richmond.

Role
The chief role of the Chairman of Committees was to chair the House when it was in committee (i.e., considering a bill at committee stage) or preside in the absence of the Speaker or when the Speaker so requested. These arrangements were based on those of the House of Commons of the United Kingdom.

The Chairman of Committees ceased to hold office on the dissolution of Parliament, but was remunerated until the next Parliament first met, when it then had a chance to elect a new chairman.

Until 1992, the Chairman of Committees was known as the Deputy Speaker only when presiding over the House. That year, the position of Deputy Speaker was made official under the Standing Orders, and the role of Chairman of Committees was discontinued. The first Deputy Speaker was appointed on 10 November 1992.

Office holders
The following is a list of Chairmen of Committees of the House of Representatives:

Key

1 Also served as Speaker

Deputy Chairman of Committees

The position of Deputy Chairman of Committees was created in 1975. After the role of chairman was replaced by that of Deputy Speaker in 1992, the third presiding officer of the House continued to be known as the deputy chairman for several more years, until the final holder of the office, Peter Hilt, became the first MP to be appointed Assistant Speaker on 21 February 1996.

Key

Notes

References

Constitution of New Zealand
Speakers of the New Zealand House of Representatives